Genci Cakciri (born May 26, 1982, Tirana, Albania) is an Albanian tennis player.

As a player
Cakciri won the National Tennis Championships of Albania for 4 successive years, in 2003 through 2006.  

Cakciri competed in the 2007 Summer Universiade in Bangkok, Thailand, losing in the third round to Russian Pavel Chekhov.  

Cakciri was also part of inaugural Albania Davis Cup team, formed in 2010, but has not played on it since.

As a coach
As of January, 2005, Cakciri was the Albanian national junior head coach.

References

External links
 
 

1982 births
Living people
Albanian male tennis players
Sportspeople from Tirana